Fatehpur Gayand is a village situated in Shahabad sub district of District Hardoi, Uttar Pradesh. Population of the village is lump som 8000. Fatehpur Gayand is a Gram Panchayat and Nyay Panchayat under Todarpur Block of District Hardoi.

Geography
Fatehpur Gayand is located at 153 km from Lucknow (capital of Uttar Pradesh) and 473 from New Delhi (capital of India).

Schools and Hospital
Primary Hospital, Fatehpur Gayand
Junior High School, Fatehpur Gayand [Estd in 1902]
Public Prathmik Vidyalaya, Fatehpur Gayand
Janseva Kendra, Fatehpur Gayand

Temples
Durga Devi Mandir[Established by Late Shri Ram Pal Singh (Pujari) Ji]
Durga Devi Mandir[Established by Late Shri Chandra Pal Singh (Pujari) Ji]
Prachin Dakshini Devi Mandir, Fatehpur Gayand
Prachin Shiv Mandir, Near - Junior High School, Fatehpur Gayand

References

2. https://earth.google.com/

Villages in Hardoi district